Royal Oak is an elevated station on the Expo Line of Metro Vancouver's SkyTrain rapid transit system. The station is located at the intersection of Beresford Street and Royal Oak Avenue in Burnaby, British Columbia, a short walk south of Kingsway and Imperial Avenue.

History
Royal Oak station was opened in 1985 as part of the original SkyTrain system (now known as the Expo Line). The Austrian architecture firm Architektengruppe U-Bahn was responsible for designing the station.

In 2002, Millennium Line service was introduced to the station, which provided outbound service to VCC–Clark station (originally Commercial–Broadway) via Columbia station in New Westminster. This service was discontinued and replaced with an Expo Line branch to Production Way–University station in 2016.

Station information

Station layout

Entrances
Royal Oak is served by a single entrance located on the south side of the station at the corner of Beresford Street and Royal Oak Avenue. An elevator is available however there is no escalator to the platform level.

Transit connections

Royal Oak is served by one bus connection: a community shuttle route to Edmonds station.

References

Expo Line (SkyTrain) stations
Railway stations in Canada opened in 1985
Buildings and structures in Burnaby
1985 establishments in British Columbia